Tolpiprazole (INN, BAN) (developmental code name H-4170) is an anxiolytic drug of the phenylpiperazine group that was never marketed.

See also
 Acaprazine
 Enpiprazole
 Lorpiprazole
 Mepiprazole

References

Anxiolytics
Phenylpiperazines
Pyrazoles